La Salle College is a Roman Catholic co-educational secondary school in Middle Swan, Western Australia, an eastern suburb of Perth. It caters for approximately 1400 Year 7-12 students, including about 40 Aboriginal boarding students from regional and remote Western Australia.

History
In 1954, three De La Salle Brothers from the eastern Australian states opened De La Salle College with 61 male students.

Faced with declining vocations, the Brothers returned to the eastern states at the end of 1971.  A College Board of Management was appointed by the Archbishop and Brother Fitzhardinge, a Christian Brother, was appointed headmaster. The name of the school was changed to La Salle College. In 1973 the girls from St Brigid’s Convent were relocated to the College resulting in La Salle becoming one of the first co-educational schools within Catholic education in WA.

Uniform 
The La Salle College uniform is compulsory for all students attending the college. During term one and four, students are expected to wear their full college summer uniform, whereas in term two and three, students are expected to wear their full college winter uniform.

The full college winter and summer uniform incorporates the school colours - red, green and gold.

The winter uniform consist of grey trouser pants for boys and a grey pleated skirt with grey tights for girls. Both genders are expected to wear the white button down college shirt with the red, green and gold striped tie and the dark green college blazer. The red jumper is optional for students.

The summer uniform consists of grey shorts for boys with the white button-down college shirt (tie optional) and for the girls, a dark green, pleated dress.

All students must wear black leather lace up shoes, have neat and tidy hair that is kept off the collar, one simple stud-earring, no visible tattoos and all skirt lengths must be on/just above the knee.

Famous Alumni 

 Jayden Fortune (Big Muss)
 Stephen Coniglio (AFL)
 Tom Wilson (Balls)
 Xavier Smith (X Money)
 Tyson Lucas (YGMT)
 Yianni Andre Demetrius (YG Demetrius)
 William Leighfelt (Lil Wetwipe)

Facilities
La Salle College is made up of buildings that were constructed in the 1950s and the 21st century. Today the original buildings coexist with contemporary facilities.
Facilities include: 
St John Baptist De La Salle Chapel  
Nicolas Barre Auditorium 
Br Fitzhardinge Trade Skills Centre  
Br Eric Pigott Performing Arts Centre
Matthew Kennedy Aquatic Centre  
Jan Jolley iCentre
Fr Lawrence Murphy Senior Learning Centre
Patricia Rodrigues Centre and 
Peter Elloy Staff Centre.
Michael Ciccarelli Lecture Theater
Photographic and Art facilities
Two large ovals and tennis, basketball and netball courts

See also
Jean-Baptiste de La Salle
Institute of the Brothers of the Christian Schools
Congregation of Christian Brothers

References

Catholic secondary schools in Perth, Western Australia
Middle Swan, Western Australia
1954 establishments in Australia
Educational institutions established in 1954